The 15th Extraordinary Convention of the Republican People's Party was held on 18 December 2010 to elect all 80 members of the Party Council of the Republican People's Party (CHP) of Turkey. It was the first Extraordinary Convention held by party leader Kemal Kılıçdaroğlu, who was elected as the party's leader in May 2010.

The vote was seen as a broad endorsement of Kılıçdaroğlu, who was half a year into his leadership. Most elected members of the Party Council were part of Kılıçdaroğlu's list of candidates. However, the election was also a setback for Deputy Leader Gürsel Tekin, who received 762 votes and thus failed to make it into the Party Council. It was rumoured that Tekin had phoned Kılıçdaroğlu at 03:00 in the morning before the convention. Left-wing actor Levent Kırca was also present at the convention.

Party council

Directly elected (68 members)
Members elected to the Party Council directly, along with the votes they received, are as follows.

Culture, Science and Executive Quota (12 members)
Members elected to the Party Council through the Culture, Science and Executive Quota, along with the votes they received, are as follows.

References

Extraordinary Conventions of the Republican People's Party (Turkey)
2010 in Turkey
2010 conferences
December 2010 events in Turkey